

Events 
 January–March 
 January 12 – After suspecting that he will be dismissed, Albrecht von Wallenstein, supreme commander of the Holy Roman Empire's Army, demands that his colonels sign a declaration of personal loyalty.
 January 14 – France's Compagnie normande obtains a one-year monopoly on trade with the African kingdoms in Guinea.
 January 19 – Charles IV, Duke of Lorraine abdicates in favor of his brother Nicholas II, who is only able to hold the throne for 75 days.
 January 24 – Ferdinand II, Holy Roman Emperor, signs a classified order dismissing Albrecht von Wallenstein, the supreme commander of the Imperial Army. 
 February 18 – Emperor Ferdinand II's dismissal of Commander Wallenstein for high treason, and the order for his capture, dead or alive, is made public. 
 February 25 – Rebel Scots and Irish soldiers assassinate Bohemian military leader Albrecht von Wallenstein at Cheb.
 March 1 – The Russians vacate their camp, ending the Siege of Smolensk.
 March 4 – Belgian scientist Jan Baptist van Helmont is interrogated by the Spanish Inquisition and put under house arrest for his experiments into plant growth. 
 March 25 – Leonard Calvert arrives in Maryland, with Jesuit missionaries Andrew White, John Altham Gravenor, and Thomas Gervase, establishing St. Mary's as the fourth permanent settlement in British North America. In this year they also establish an institution of higher learning there, which later becomes Georgetown University, the United States's oldest university.

 April–June 
 April 1 – Nicholas II, Duke of Lorraine, who assumed the throne of the duchy on January 19 upon the abdication of his older brother Charles IV abdicates in favor of Charles.
 April 14 – The Battle of Amritsar begins in India when Mughal Empire troops attempt to eliminate the Sikh religious leader, Guru Hargobind, by attacking Amritsar. The Sikh defenders hand the Mughal invaders an unprecedented defeat. 
 May 2 – With Albrecht Wallenstein having been eliminated, the Holy Roman Emperor Ferdinand II personally takes command of the Imperial Army.  
 May 5 – King Charles I of England and Scotland first refers to the banner of the British Isles as the "Union Flag" in a proclamation that the flag shall not be used on any ships other than those "in our immediate Service and Pay, and none other." The term evolves into the description of the British flag as the "Union Jack".
 June 14 – The Treaty of Polyanovka is signed between the Polish–Lithuanian Commonwealth and the Tsardom of Russia, concluding the Smolensk War.

 July–September 
 July 4 – The city of Trois-Rivières is founded in New France, in what is now the Canadian province of Quebec.
 August 18 – In France, Urbain Grandier, accused of wizardry, is burned alive in Loudun.
 August (prob.) – Jean Nicolet becomes the first European to set foot in what is now the U.S. state of Wisconsin. He is in search of a water-route to the Pacific, when he lands at Green Bay of Lake Michigan.
 September 6 – The Battle of Nördlingen ends after two days with a decisive victory for the Army of the Holy Roman Empire and Habsburg Spain.
 September 12 – A gunpowder factory explodes in Valletta, Malta, killing 22 people and damaging several buildings.

 October–December 
 October 11 – The Burchardi flood (also known as the second Grote Mandrenke) strikes the North Sea coast of Germany and Denmark, causing at least 8,000 deaths and perhaps as many as 12,000.
 November 11 – The Irish House of Commons passes an Act for the Punishment of the Vice of Buggery.
 December 8 – Francesco Niccolini obtains an audience with Pope Urban VIII and pleads him to reconsider the Church's punishment of astronomer Galileo Galilei. The Pope replies that although he esteems Galileo highly, nothing will change. 
 December 16 – Gregorio Panzani, an emissary of Pope Urban VIII, is welcomed in England by King Charles I,  marking the first time since England's break with the Roman Catholic Church that a monarch has received an agent of the Vatican.

 Date unknown 
 Curaçao is captured by the Dutch.
 The English establish a settlement at Cochin (modern-day Kochi) on the Malabar Coast.
 Suspecting that Patriarch Afonso Mendes played a part in the Portuguese assault on Mombasa, Emperor Fasilides expels him and several Jesuit missionaries from Ethiopia.
 The Académie Française is formed by Cardinal Richelieu (it will be formally established in 1635).
 The first performance of the Oberammergau Passion Play is held in Bavaria.
 Moses Amyraut's Traité de la predestination is published.
 The Paulaner Brewery is established in Munich, by Minim friars.

Births

January–March 
 January 1 – Fleetwood Sheppard, English poet (d. 1698)
 January 7
 Sophia Eleonore of Hesse-Darmstadt, Landgravine consort of Hesse-Homburg (d. 1663)
 Adam Krieger, German composer (d. 1666)
 Katarzyna Sobieska, Polish noble (d. 1694)
 January 16 – Dorothe Engelbretsdotter, Norway's first professional female author (d. 1716)
 January 25 – Gaspar Fagel, Dutch statesman (d. 1688)
 January 30 – Johann Hugo von Orsbeck, Archbishop-Elector of Trier (d. 1711)
 February 2 – Alfonso IV d'Este, Duke of Modena, Italian noble (d. 1662)
 February 5 – Maria Antonia Scalera Stellini, Italian poet (d. 1704)
 February 6 – George Christian, Prince of East Frisia, prince of Ostfriesland (d. 1665)
 February 7 – Robert Robartes, Viscount Bodmin, English diplomat and politician (d. 1682)
 February 8 – Teodósio, Prince of Brazil, Brazilian prince (d. 1653)
 March 4 – Kazimierz Łyszczyński, Polish philosopher (d. 1689)
 March 11 – Nicholas Gassaway, Colonel, Maryland Provincial Forces (d. 1691)
 March 12 – Cornelis Kick, Dutch painter (d. 1681)
 March 18 – Marie-Madeleine de La Fayette, French novelist (d. 1693)
 March 20 – Balthasar Bekker, Dutch minister and author of philosophical and theological works (d. 1698)
 March 23 – Philip Smythe, 2nd Viscount Strangford, English Member of Parliament (d. 1708)
 March 25 – George Bull, English theologian and Bishop of St David's (d. 1710)
 March 26 – Domenico Freschi, Italian opera composer, Catholic priest (d. 1710)
 March 28 – Sir Richard Temple, 3rd Baronet,  English Member of Parliament (d. 1697)

April–June 
 April 3 – Stanisław Jan Jabłonowski, Polish noble (d. 1702)
 April 8
 John Adolphus, Duke of Schleswig-Holstein-Sonderburg-Plön, German duke (d. 1704)
 Joseph Alleine, English Nonconformist pastor, author (d. 1668)
 April 9 – Countess Albertine Agnes of Nassau, Regent of Friesland, Groningen and Drenthe (1664–1679) (d. 1696)
 April 14 – Sir John Reresby, 2nd Baronet, 17th-century English politician and diarist (d. 1689)
 April 25 – Robert Montagu, 3rd Earl of Manchester, English politician (d. 1683)
 May 4 – Lady Katherine Ferrers, English aristocrat and heiress (d. 1660)
 May 7 – Richard Legh, English politician (d. 1687)
 May 8 – Alexander Stuart, 5th Earl of Moray, Scottish nobleman (d. 1701)
 June 1 – Roeloff Swartwout, American city founder in New York (d. 1715)
 June 6 – Maria Elisabeth of Holstein-Gottorp, Landgravine of Hesse-Darmstadt (d. 1665)
 June 14 – Nathaniel Bond, English politician (d. 1707)
 June 20 – Charles Emmanuel II, Duke of Savoy (d. 1675)
 June 27 – Andreas Cleyer, German physician, pharmacist, botanist, and trader of the Dutch East India Company (d. 1698)

July–September 
 July 3 – Countess Palatine Dorothea Catherine of Birkenfeld-Bischweiler, Countess of Nassau-Ottweiler (d. 1715)
 July 8 – Thomas Butler, 6th Earl of Ossory (d. 1680)
 July 12 – John George I, Duke of Saxe-Eisenach, German duke (d. 1686)
 July 14 – Pasquier Quesnel, French Jansenist theologian (d. 1719)
 July 18 – Johannes Camphuys, Governor-General of the Dutch East Indies (d. 1695)
 July 23 – Sir John Hoskyns, 2nd Baronet, English politician (d. 1705)
 August 12 – Adam Colonia, Dutch Golden Age painter (d. 1685)
 August 16 – Johann Daniel Major, German professor of theoretical medicine (d. 1693)
 August 24 – Mary Eastey, American witch (d. 1692)
 August 31 – Paul Amman, German physician, botanist (d. 1691)
 September 4 – Robert South, English churchman known for his combative preaching (d. 1716)
 September 6 – Thomas Tryon, British hat maker (d. 1703)
 September 7 – Sir Richard Bulkeley, 1st Baronet, Irish politician (d. 1685)
 September 22 – Christiana of Schleswig-Holstein-Sonderburg-Glücksburg, duchess consort of Saxe-Merseburg (1650–1691) (d. 1701)

October–December 
 October 10 – Jan van Neck, Dutch painter (d. 1714)
 October 18 – Luca Giordano, Italian late Baroque painter and printmaker in etching (d. 1705)
 November 6 – Giuseppe Ghezzi, Italian painter (d. 1721)
 November 7 – Francis Winnington, Solicitor-General for England and Wales (d. 1700)
 November 23 – Paulet St John, 3rd Earl of Bolingbroke, English politician (d. 1711)
 November 25 – Richard Slater, English politician (d. 1699)
 November 27 – Roger Toothaker, victim of the Salem witch trials (d. 1692)
 November 28 – Marie Luise von Degenfeld, morganatic second wife of Charles I Louis, Elector Palatine of Germany (d. 1677)
 December 15 – Thomas Kingo, Danish bishop (d. 1703)
 December 22 – Mariana of Austria (d. 1696)
 December 31 – Hotta Masatoshi, Japanese rōjū to Shōgun Tokugawa Ietsuna (d. 1684)

Deaths 

 January 17 – Albert Szenczi Molnár, Hungarian translator (b. 1574)
 February 15 – Anna Maria of Ostfriesland, German noblewoman (b. 1601)
 February 25 – Albrecht von Wallenstein, Bohemian general (assassinated) (b. 1583)
 March 23 – Elizabeth Finch, 1st Countess of Winchilsea, English countess (b. 1556)
 April 2 – Maria Celeste, Italian nun, daughter of Galileo Galilei (b. 1600)
 April 8 – Giovanni Srofenaur, Italian musician (b. 1580)
 May 12 – George Chapman, English author (b. c.1559)
 May 15 (bur.) – Hendrick Avercamp, Dutch painter (b. 1585)
 June 22 – Johann von Aldringen, Austrian field marshal (b. 1588)
 June 25 – John Marston, English dramatist (b. 1576)
 July 25 – Francesco de' Medici, Tuscan prince (b. 1614)
 August 9 – William Noy, English jurist (b. 1577)
 August 11 – Frederick Ulrich, Duke of Brunswick-Lüneburg (b. 1591)
 August 18 – Urbain Grandier, French priest (b. 1590)
 September 3 – Edward Coke, English colonial entrepreneur and jurist (b. 1552)
 September 6 – Frederick III, Margrave of Brandenburg-Ansbach (b. 1616)
 September 26 – Dorothea of Anhalt-Zerbst, Duchess of Brunswick-Wolfenbüttel (b. 1607)
 October 6 – Otto Louis of Salm-Kyrburg-Mörchingen, Swedish general in the Thirty Years' War (b. 1597)
 October 8 – Francis Julius of Saxe-Lauenburg, Prince (b. 1584)
 October 19 – Agnes of Jesus, French Catholic nun (b. 1602)
 November 14 – Sophia of Holstein-Gottorp, Regent of Mecklenburg-Schwerin (1603–1608) (b. 1569)
 November 19 – Alexander Charles Vasa, 5th son of King Sigismund III Vasa (b. 1614)
 November 20 – Anna Maria of Solms-Sonnewalde, Countess consort of Hohenlohe-Langenburg (b. 1585)
 December 11 – Fadrique de Toledo, 1st Marquis of Villanueva de Valdueza, Spanish noble and admiral (b. 1580)
 December 25 – Lettice Knollys, English noblewoman (b. 1543)
 December 29 – John Albert Vasa, Polish bishop (b. 1612)
 date unknown
 Adriano Banchieri, Italian composer (b. 1568)
 Johan Bara, Dutch painter, engraver (b. c. 1581)

References